Chía is a city and municipality in the Cundinamarca department of Colombia, located to the north of Bogotá on the main road to Zipaquira. Its history dates back to the pre-Columbian era.

Due to its proximity to Bogotá, Chía has effectively become a suburb of the capital. It is also home of the Universidad de la Sabana.

Chia is also known for its gastronomy and its variety of restaurants, ones of the best-known restaurants are Andres Carne de Res, El Galapago, El Despacho and The Store of Don Chucho.

Etymology 
The place-name Chía, also pronounced like Chie in muysc cubun Chibcha language or Muisca language means Moon, although it also has the meanings of «light», «brightness», «glow» (of a luminous source), Month and «nettle» (plant). However, it is not strictly speaking the same word with several meanings, but of several homonymous words, each of which would be understood depending on the context in which it was pronounced.

In the case of the name of the municipality, the place name "Chía" refers to the Moon as a star and as a goddess of the Muisca mythology, in whose honour there was a temple built in the Pre-Columbian town.

History 
Chía was inhabited first by indigenous groups during the Herrera Period and later by the Muisca, as an important settlement in the pre-Columbian era. It was a ceremonial center of worship to the Moon goddess Chía. On March 24, 1537, the Spanish, under the command of Gonzalo Jiménez de Quesada, took possession of the town.

In 1781, during the Revolt of the Comuneros, the march of the insurgents towards Bogotá stopped near Chía in order to cross the Bogotá River, in what is now known as the Bridge of the Commoners . At that site, the viceroy signed a series of concessions to the rebels. However, once the rebel group had dispersed, the viceroy declared the concessions invalid for having been signed "under pressure". It is widely believed that eventually Bogota will merge with Chia if the city continues to expand (as it happened with Bosa and Soacha).

Borders 
 North with Cajicá
 South with Bogotá localities Usaquén and Suba
 West with Tabio and Tenjo
 Southwest with Cota
 East with Sopó
Southeast with La Calera.

Other information 
 Market Day: Sunday
 Median temperature: 14 °C
 DANE Code: 25175

Sites of interest 
 El Castillo Marroquín - Marroquín Castle. The Marroquin Castle is a building built in 1898, located in the grounds of the Hacienda El Castillo in the sector of La Caro, north of Bogotá. It is a building by the French architect Gastón Lelarge. The castle is a cultural heritage and is used for events and meetings of various types.
 Hacienda Yerbabuena
 Puente del Común
 Chía Mall (Centro-Chía)
 Andrés Carne de Res
 Iglesia la Valvanera
 Biblioteca Publica Municipal HOQABIGA
 Parque Santander
 Fontanar Mall (Centro Comercial Fontanar)
 La Montaña del Oso. It is a natural park located in the village of Yerbabuena, about 3200 meters above sea level. It is possible to take guided ecological walks, as well as camping.
 Capilla de Nuestra Señora de la Valvanera - Chapel of Our Lady of Valvanera. It is located at the top of the western hill of Chia, and is visible almost from any point of the municipality. It can be reached by walking on the steps built for this purpose, or by the two existing roads on land. Eucharistic celebrations are held every Sunday and from the adjacent balcony, there is also a panoramic view of the municipality. The road that leads to the other side of the hill (the "Boquerón") towards the municipality of Tenjo is also a frequent site for mountain biking, along with the other road that crosses the hill a little further north and that will give the municipality of Tabio (known as "Lourdes").

Sports facilities 
 Coliseo de la Luna (8,000 spectators), playing ground for the basketball team Cóndores de Cundinamarca
 Sports unit "Rio Frio"
 Olympic village
 BMX Track "Iván de Jesús Barrientos"

Gallery

References

External links 

  : FOTW: Flag and Coat of Arms of Chia

Municipalities of Cundinamarca Department
Populated places established in 1537
1537 establishments in the Spanish Empire
1537 disestablishments in the Muisca Confederation
Muysccubun